Peter Schröder is a German American computer scientist and a professor of computer science at California Institute of Technology. Schröder is known for his contributions to discrete differential geometry and digital geometry processing. He is also a world expert in the area of wavelet based methods for computer graphics. In 2015, Schröder was elected as a Fellow of the Association for Computing Machinery for "contributions to computer graphics and geometry processing.".

Biography 
Schröder received an M.S. from MIT's Media Lab in 1990, and a Ph.D. in computer science from Princeton University in 1994 under the supervision of Pat Hanrahan.  In 1995, he joined the faculty of Caltech. He did his undergraduate work at the Technical University of Berlin in computer science and pure mathematics.

Awards 
Schröder is the recipient of an NSF CAREER award, a Sloan Fellowship, a Packard Fellowship, and in 2015 was elected as a fellow of the Association for Computing Machinery.  He is also the recipient of the ACM SIGGRAPH Computer Graphics Achievement Award in 2003.

References 

Living people
Fellows of the Association for Computing Machinery
Year of birth missing (living people)